The Minor Accomplishments of Jackie Woodman is an American comedy television series from World of Wonder Productions, co-written, executive produced by and starring Laura Kightlinger. The series premiered on IFC August 4, 2006. Season two began on August 5, 2007 on IFC.

Main characters
 Jackie Woodman (Laura Kightlinger), a surly writer for a second rate indie film rag and aspiring screenwriter. Her refusal to be a part of the superficial world of Hollywood is at odds with her desire to be one of the successful elite.
 Tara Wentzel (Nicholle Tom), Jackie's best friend and an initially low-level employee at a film production company (she is promoted in season two.) Sexually promiscuous, she embodies everything about Hollywood that Jackie loathes/loves.

Recurring Characters
 Skyler (Azura Skye), Jackie's editor and a trendy, superficial bitch.
 Mitchell (Patrick Bristow), Skyler's sycophantic assistant, who is openly rude to Jackie.
 Bobby Paterniti (Jeremy Kramer), the seasoned and brash producer of the "Cat Demon" franchise at Night Sky. 
 Ray (Steven Pierce), a security guard at Tara's production company Night Sky. Pierce also appears as a member of The Platform cult in the pilot.
 Jeanette Woodman (Mary Kay Place), Jackie's passive-aggressive mother. She is first heard in season one over the phone and embodied by a turtle during a peyote hallucination. In season two, she visits Jackie twice, annoying Jackie incessantly in the process. 
 Angela Birnbaum (Colleen Camp), Jackie's occasional agent. She is quick to trust, love, and overestimate anyone she comes into contact with.
 Cheryl (Octavia Spencer), a wisecracking security guard at Night Sky.
 Carol Rinaldi (Suzy Nakamura), an executive producer at Night Sky.
 Darryl (Rashaan Nall), Jackie's apartment building handyman and occasional confidant (season one).
 Ken (John Kapelos), Tara's boss at Night Sky (season one).
 Mike Ackerman (Giuseppe Andrews), an aspiring writer who steals Jackie's script (season one).
 Lars Ahlstrom (Hugh Davidson), Tara's misogynistic boss at Night Sky (season two).
 Jim Fig (Jon Kinnally), Jackie's hunky downstairs neighbor who moonlights as a serial killer. He randomly appears throughout season two, usually in passing as Jackie sees him outside. His appearances are followed with non sequitur glimpses of him torturing abductees or disposing of bodies. His motives are never explained or brought to the attention of any character, although Jackie chooses to ignore one of his victims when she accidentally sees him writhing below her kitchen window.

Episodes
All episodes were written by Laura Kightlinger & David Punch.

Season 1 (2006)

Season 2 (2007)

Critical reception
Dana Gee of The Province rated the show "B", stating that "unlike most sitcoms, there are no morality plays and characters are not given a patina to make them seem a little more interesting."

Home media
Season one was released on DVD as of July 17, 2007.

International broadcast
An entire run of the series was screened in the United Kingdom on the now defunct channel, Film 24.

References

External links
 IMDB listing

2000s American sitcoms
2006 American television series debuts
2007 American television series endings
IFC (American TV channel) original programming